Proxanthobasis is a genus of parasitic flies in the family Tachinidae. There are at least three described species in Proxanthobasis.

Species
These three species belong to the genus Proxanthobasis:
 Proxanthobasis aldrichi Blanchard, 1966
 Proxanthobasis rufescens Blanchard, 1966
 Proxanthobasis rufipes Blanchard, 1966

References

Further reading

 
 
 
 

Tachinidae
Articles created by Qbugbot